was the 6th daimyō of Kakegawa Domain in Tōtōmi Province, (modern-day Shizuoka Prefecture) in late-Edo period Japan and 10th hereditary chieftain of the Kakegawa-Ōta clan.

Biography
Ōta Sukekatsu was the eldest son of Ōta Sukemoto, the 5th daimyō of Kakegawa Domain. He was received in formal audience by Shogun Tokugawa Ieyoshi in March 1841 and became head of the Ōta clan and daimyō of Kakegawa on his father's retirement on June 10 of the same year. He was appointed to the offices of sōshaban in 1847 and Jisha-bugyō in 1849, but resigned from his posts in 1856 due to ill health. He predeceased his father, dying in 1862 at the age of 34.

Ōta Sukekatsu was married to a daughter of the rōjū Aoyama Tadanaga, of Sasayama Domain and is known to have had at least one daughter (who married Itakura Katsusuke of Bitchū-Matsuyama Domain). However, on his death, the position of daimyō of Kakegawa went to his younger brother, Ōta Sukeyoshi.

His grave is at the Ōta clan bodaiji of Myōhokke-ji in Mishima, Shizuoka.

References 
 Papinot, Edmund. (1906) Dictionnaire d'histoire et de géographie du japon. Tokyo: Librarie Sansaisha...Click link for digitized 1906 Nobiliaire du japon (2003)
 The content of much of this article was derived from that of the corresponding article on Japanese Wikipedia.

|-

Fudai daimyo
Sukekatsu
1827 births
1862 deaths